were a class of riverine gunboats of the Imperial Japanese Navy.

The class consisted of 4 vessels: 
 Seta (勢多)
 Katata (堅田)
 Hira (比良)
 Hozu (保津)

 
Gunboat classes
Riverine warfare